Westbury is a township municipality in Le Haut-Saint-François Regional County Municipality, in Quebec, Canada. It surrounds the city of East Angus.

The township had a population of 1,006 in the Canada 2016 Census.

Demographics 

References

External links

Township municipalities in Quebec
Incorporated places in Estrie
Le Haut-Saint-François Regional County Municipality